Alvin Singh (born 9 June 1988) is a Fijian footballer who plays as a centre back for Mt Druitt Town Rangers FC and the Fiji national football team.

International career 
Singh made his debut for the senior national team in a 2–0 win against Vanuatu on 6 September 2008.

On 16 July 2016, he was named as one of the three over-aged players for the Fiji under-23 team at the 2016 Summer Olympics.

International goals

References

External links

1988 births
Living people
People from Ba Province
Fijian footballers
Fiji international footballers
Fijian people of Indian descent
Sportspeople of Indian descent
Association football midfielders
Ba F.C. players
Hekari United players
Olympic footballers of Fiji
APIA Leichhardt FC players
Mounties Wanderers FC players
Expatriate footballers in Papua New Guinea
Expatriate soccer players in Australia
Fijian expatriate sportspeople in Papua New Guinea
Fijian expatriate sportspeople in Australia
2008 OFC Nations Cup players
2012 OFC Nations Cup players
2016 OFC Nations Cup players
Footballers at the 2016 Summer Olympics